Hong Kong Confidential is a 2010 romantic comedy-drama film written and directed by Latvian director Māris Martinsons.

It was chosen as Latvia's submission for the Academy Award for Best Foreign Language Film at the 83rd Academy Awards, but it did not make the final shortlist.

Plot
Hong Kong: one week in one of the most exotic and picturesque cities of the world.  The movie follows six characters whose lives are all connected in one way or another.  The day of changes comes when Amaya (Kaori Momoi) meets a charming Englishman, Paul. Their encounter dramatically changes Amaya's perception of her cultural and personal identity. Their lives change forever. But one thing remains universal, love.

Cast
Kaori Momoi as Amaya
Andrius Mamontovas as Paul
Monie Tung as Jasmine
Kristīne Nevarauska as Lori
Lau Dan as Tao
Hui Shiu Hung as Renshu
Dexter Fletcher as Frenchman
Laura Luīze Dzenīte as Kitty
Margaret Cheung as Lang

See also
 List of submissions to the 83rd Academy Awards for Best Foreign Language Film
 List of Latvian submissions for the Academy Award for Best Foreign Language Film

References

External links
  
 

2010 films
Hong Kong comedy-drama films
Latvian comedy-drama films
2010s English-language films
2010s Cantonese-language films
2010s Japanese-language films
2010 comedy-drama films
2010 multilingual films
English-language Hong Kong films
English-language Latvian films
2010s Hong Kong films